Ben Sinclair is a former professional Australian rules footballer who played for the Collingwood Football Club in the Australian Football League (AFL). A very quick midfielder who represented Vic Metro at the 2009 AFL National Under 18 Championships, he was drafted with the 62nd selection in the 2009 AFL Draft from the Oakleigh Chargers in the TAC Cup.

His father, Peter Sinclair played for Melbourne in the late 1960s and his half-brother Will Slade played for Geelong in the early 2000s.

He was awarded the Round 11 2012 AFL Rising Star nomination after kicking three goals and performing well against  in the Queen's Birthday clash.

He retired from AFL football at the conclusion of the 2017 season.

Statistics
 Statistics are correct to the end of the 2017 season

|- style="background:#eaeaea;"
! scope="row" style="text-align:center" | 2010
|style="text-align:center;"|
| 28 || 0 || — || — || — || — || — || — || — || — || — || — || — || — || — || —
|- 
! scope="row" style="text-align:center" | 2011
|style="text-align:center;"|
| 28 || 4 || 2 || 3 || 20 || 25 || 45 || 8 || 12 || 0.5 || 0.8 || 5.0 || 6.3 || 11.3 || 2.0 || 3.0
|- style="background:#eaeaea;"
! scope="row" style="text-align:center" | 2012
|style="text-align:center;"|
| 28 || 20 || 14 || 11 || 129 || 82 || 211 || 50 || 44 || 0.7 || 0.6 || 6.5 || 4.1 || 10.6 || 2.5 || 2.2
|- 
! scope="row" style="text-align:center" | 2013
|style="text-align:center;"|
| 28 || 15 || 2 || 1 || 100 || 88 || 188 || 44 || 42 || 0.1 || 0.1 || 6.7 || 5.9 || 12.5 || 2.9 || 2.8
|- style="background:#eaeaea;"
! scope="row" style="text-align:center" | 2014
|style="text-align:center;"|
| 28 || 5 || 2 || 1 || 34 || 39 || 73 || 17 || 7 || 0.4 || 0.2 || 6.8 || 7.8 || 14.6 || 3.4 || 1.4
|- 
! scope="row" style="text-align:center" | 2015
|style="text-align:center;"|
| 28 || 6 || 0 || 1 || 53 || 35 || 88 || 17 || 12 || 0 || 0.2 || 8.8 || 5.8 || 14.7 || 2.8 || 2.0
|- style="background:#eaeaea;"
! scope="row" style="text-align:center" | 2016
|style="text-align:center;"|
| 28 || 13 || 2 || 2 || 105 || 94 || 199 || 36 || 30 || 0.2 || 0.2 || 8.1 || 7.2 || 15.3 || 2.8 || 2.3
|- 
! scope="row" style="text-align:center" | 2017
|style="text-align:center;"|
| 28 || 0 || — || — || — || — || — || — || — || — || — || — || — || — || — || —
|- class="sortbottom"
! colspan=3| Career
! 63
! 22
! 19
! 441
! 363
! 804
! 172
! 147
! 0.4
! 0.3
! 7.0
! 5.8
! 12.8
! 2.7
! 2.3
|}

References

External links 

 
 

Australian rules footballers from Victoria (Australia)
Collingwood Football Club players
Living people
1991 births
Oakleigh Chargers players